Crazy Gopalan is a 2008 Indian Malayalam-language comedy thriller film directed by Deepu Karunakaran. The film stars Dileep in the title role with Radha Varma, Salim Kumar, Jagathy Sreekumar, Manoj K. Jayan and Biju Menon in pivotal roles. The film was produced and distributed by Ullattil Visual Media. Story, screenplay and dialogues are handled by Deepu Karunakaran.

The story revolves around two thieves Gopalan (Dileep) and Lakshmanan (Salim Kumar) and challenges faced by Gopalan after the death of Lakshmanan.

Plot

Kattila Gopalan is a notorious name in the village Oonjaalaadi. Though nobody has seen Gopalan, people hold him in dread as he is a thief who always manages to steal whatever he wants, without ever getting caught or even being seen by anyone. His identity remains a mystery.

Then one day Harichandran, a carpenter happens to see Gopalan for the first time. Gopalan is thus forced to flee the little village and seeks refuge in the city. There he meets Lakshmanan, another thief who has an ailing mother to look after. They form a team and start thieving, Lakshmanan to treat his mother and Gopalan with an aim to buy back his ancestral house which he has lost in his childhood. And then a girl named Diana and her brother Babu John, a rich banker, come into the lives of Gopalan and Lakshmanan. Life changes drastically for the duo.

Lakshmanan gets killed by Babu John while Gopalan hardly managed to save his life. Then people spread rumours that Gopalan killed Lakshmanan and gone away with the money and Lavang Vasu finds Gopalan's body on the seashore and hoping that he could get some money, he takes Gopalan to home only to find out that Gopalan does not have money. Gopalan then teams up with Vasu and promised him to give the amount he needed. One day, Gopalan finds Diana in a church. When he caught her red handed, she revealed her past. She didn't actually like Babu John as he killed her parents and boyfriend Sooraj. Babu John was an adopted son for her parents. Gopalan then plans with Diana to kill Babu John without any proofs. At first he robbed the Investors Bank brilliantly with the help of Vasu. Now Babu John is heartbroken. City Police Commissioner Vinod Abraham tries to resolve the case and is now on a mission to find out Gopalan. He unknowingly takes Harichandran to police station as they thought he was Gopalan. As Harichandran was firm that he was not Gopalan, the police officer calls Chacko KT, the assistant of Babu John. He says that Harichandran is Gopalan. Then Harichandran on seeing Gopalan's photo reveals the truth. Vinod plans to catch Gopalan with Harichandran's help and he does while coming from a shopping center. Even though the police chased Gopalan, he tactically escaped and planned another way with Diana where she acted as if she made him caught red handed by police to accompany Babu John. This was in order to find out the hidden bars of gold which were hidden in a place that only Babu John and Chacko knew. However when her plans go in vain, she informs this to Gopalan. Gopalan then thought of another trick to use Chacko in order to find gold bars and black money. As planned, Diana had informed that Babu John would ruin Chacko's family indirectly. Feared Chacko goes to file a case to the commissioner regarding the place where the black money and gold were hidden. Babu John was arriving from Singapore. But he was caught by the police. However, Diana pranked Babu John and took him to the place where Gopalan was waiting for him. Even though Gopalan was brutally beaten up first, he recalls Babu John killing Lakshmanan and mustered up strength. He beats back Babu John and finally killed him with the help of Vasu. He calls the commissioner and informed in Babu John's sound that Babu John had gone to a safe place.

Gopalan, along with Diana and Vasu goes back to Oonjaladi village where he is surprised to learn that Kattala Gopalan over there is Harichandran.

Cast

Music
The songs of this movie were composed by Rahul Raj. The film had 3 songs, out of which 2 of them appeared in the movie.

Track listing

References

External links
 

2000s Malayalam-language films
2008 films
Films shot in Kochi
Indian heist films
Indian comedy thriller films
Films scored by Rahul Raj